Kenneth Ferguson (born March 22, 1984) is an American sprinter and hurdler who specializes in the 400 metres, 110 and 400 metre hurdles.

He won three gold medals at the 2003 Pan American Junior Athletics Championships, in the 110 metre and 400 meters hurdles, and 4×400 metres relay.
He is the husband of multiple Olympic and World Championship medalist Allyson Felix, with whom he has a daughter.

References

External links

DyeStat profile for Kenneth Ferguson
USA Track & Field bio
South Carolina Gamecocks track and field bio

1984 births
Living people
Track and field athletes from Detroit
American male sprinters
South Carolina Gamecocks men's track and field athletes